This is about the first season.

Super Speaker is a TV show produced by Anhui TV in 2013.

Members of Le Jia Group
Ye Zihan, Chen Zhou, Cui Yongping, Li He, Yang Xinglong, Li Chengyuan

Among all the members, none of them left the competition when sent out against members of other judges. Cui Yongping succeeded in the inter-group competitions and claimed the champion's place.

Members of Li Yong Group
Tang Bi, Chen Ming, Xie Yi, Suan Suan, Ji Jianjing, Cao Qingwan

Tang Bi, Ji Jianjing and Suan Suan were eliminated in the competition in which they were against other members. Cao Qingwan reached the highest of her group, claiming the runner-up position.

Members of Jimmy Lin Group
Huang Chengcheng, Xu Haojie, Huang Xiaoshan, Han Lengna, Da Wang

Han Lengna and Da Wang were eliminated in the second speech. Xu Haojie bet Huang Xiaoshan when both of them received votes and went to speed-talk round. Xu Haojie later made it to the third place.

Members of Chen Luyu Group
Chen Wenya, Guan Bing, Long Yang, Li Ning*, Huang Xiaopang, Li Lin 

Guan Bing was eliminated first. Li Lin would claim the fourth place.

Li Ning was qualified after no more competitors were left, so Luyu chose Li Ning to fill up the gap.

References

2013 Chinese television series debuts
Chinese reality television series